Jameson Lee Taillon (born November 18, 1991) is a Canadian-American  professional baseball pitcher for the Chicago Cubs of Major League Baseball (MLB). He has previously played in MLB for the Pittsburgh Pirates and New York Yankees.

The Pirates chose Taillon as the second overall pick in the 2010 MLB draft. He made his MLB debut in 2016. The Pirates traded Taillon to the Yankees before the 2021 season and signed with the Cubs after the 2022 season.

Early life
Jameson Taillon was born in Lakeland, Florida to Christie and Michael Taillon on November 18, 1991. Taillon attended The Woodlands High School in Texas. He caught the attention of scouts with a 22–6 win–loss record in his high school career. He was 8–1 during his senior year and threw a 19-strikeout no-hitter against rival Conroe High School on March 23, 2010.

Professional career

Minor league career
Prior to the 2010 MLB draft, Fangraphs called Taillon the best high school pitching prospect since Josh Beckett (1999). Baseball America compared him to pitchers like Stephen Strasburg. The Pittsburgh Pirates selected Taillon with the second overall selection of the draft. He had signed a National Letter of Intent with Rice University in November 2009 posing a challenge to the Pirates in their effort to sign him. However, hours before the signing deadline, the Pittsburgh Post-Gazette reported that Taillon had indeed signed with the Pirates. Baseball Americas Jim Callis reported that Taillon's deal included a $6.5 million signing bonus, the second-highest in draft history.

Taillon made his professional debut with the West Virginia Power against the Hagerstown Suns on April 27, 2011. He joined the team on April 24 after staying in Florida for an extended spring training assignment. He spent the whole season with the Power, going 2–3 with a 3.98 earned run average (ERA) in 23 starts.

Taillon was named to appear in the 2012 All-Star Futures Game. He began the season with the Bradenton Marauders and he was promoted to the Altoona Curve in August 2012. In his first week with the Curve, August 20–26, 2012, Taillon was named the Eastern League pitcher of the week. In 26 starts between the two teams, he was 9–8 with a 3.55 ERA.

Prior to the 2013 season, Taillon was ranked as the 15th best prospect in baseball by MLB.com. Taillon participated in the 2013 World Baseball Classic for Team Canada, being the youngest member of the team at age 21. He began the season with Altoona and was promoted to the Indianapolis Indians in August. In 26 games (25 starts) between both clubs, Taillon compiled a 5–10 record and 3.73 ERA.

Taillon underwent Tommy John surgery in April 2014 to repair damage to the ulnar collateral ligament of the elbow in his throwing arm, costing him the 2014 season. A hernia surgery caused him to miss the 2015 season.

Pittsburgh Pirates (2016–2020) 
Taillon returned in 2016 with the Pirates, where he made 10 starts before earning his first major league call-up. Taillon went 4–2 with a 2.04 ERA, striking out 61 in 61.2 innings and walking only 6. On June 8, Taillon was recalled to make a spot start with the Pirates, who decided to push back Francisco Liriano's start one day after they played a doubleheader the day before. Facing off against fellow 2010 first rounder Noah Syndergaard in his debut, Taillon threw 6 innings, giving up 3 runs on 6 hits, 2 walks, and 3 strikeouts, not receiving a decision in the eventual 6–5 loss. After the game, Taillon was optioned back to Triple-A, but not without receiving compliments from his manager, Clint Hurdle, on his effort, saying, "This kid's poured into everything he's done. It's been a great fight back." However, his stay in Indianapolis was very brief, as an injury to Gerrit Cole necessitated a move to bring Taillon back into the rotation. On June 14, Taillon made his second start, also against the Mets, throwing 8 scoreless innings, carrying a no-hitter into the seventh before it was broken up by Curtis Granderson, and recording his first win in the 4–0 victory. In July, he was hit in the head by a batted ball. Taillon spent the remainder of 2016 with Pittsburgh. In 18 starts, he compiled a 5–4 record and a 3.38 ERA.

Taillon was in the Pirates' starting rotation in 2017. He was placed on the disabled list in May as he underwent surgery for testicular cancer. Taillon made his first rehabilitation start three weeks later, giving up one run in three innings. He returned to the mound for the Pirates on June 12. In 25 starts during the 2017 season, he pitched to an 8–7 record and 4.44 ERA.

In the 2018 season, Taillon spent the entire season on the roster without being injured, pitching to a 3.20 ERA in 32 starts. He was 14–10 in 191 innings.

In 2019, Taillon's season was cut short due to a forearm injury. He was shut down for the remainder of the season on August 2, 2019; he was 2–3 with a 4.10 ERA in 7 starts. On August 14, he underwent surgery to repair a flexor tendon as well as UCL revision. Taillon missed all of 2020 as well.

New York Yankees (2021–2022) 
On January 24, 2021, the Pirates traded Taillon to the New York Yankees for prospects Miguel Yajure, Roansy Contreras, Maikol Escotto, and Canaan Smith-Njigba. He was named the American League Pitcher of the Month in July, posting a 1.16 ERA. He finished the 2021 season with an 8–6 record in 29 starts with a 4.30 ERA and 140 strikeouts in  innings. On June 2, 2022, Taillon pitched seven perfect innings against the Los Angeles Angels. This bid was broken up by a Jared Walsh double in the eighth inning.

Chicago Cubs
On December 19, 2022, Taillon signed a four-year deal with the Chicago Cubs.

Personal life
Taillon underwent surgery for testicular cancer on May 8, 2017. He had one testicle removed. As of 2019, he was cancer-free.

Although he was born in the United States, Taillon's parents are Canadian, and he holds citizenship in both countries.

References

External links

Video of Taillon's pro debut for the West Virginia Power in 2011

1991 births
Living people
Altoona Curve players
American people of Canadian descent
Baseball players from Florida
Baseball players from Texas
Bradenton Marauders players
Canadian baseball players
Indianapolis Indians players
Major League Baseball pitchers
New York Yankees players
People from The Woodlands, Texas
Pittsburgh Pirates players
Scottsdale Scorpions players
Sportspeople from Harris County, Texas
Sportspeople from Lakeland, Florida
Twitch (service) streamers
West Virginia Power players
World Baseball Classic players of Canada
2013 World Baseball Classic players